Michael Mando (born July 13, 1981) is a Canadian actor. He played Nacho Varga on the AMC series Better Call Saul (2015–2022), Vaas Montenegro in the video game franchise Far Cry (2012, 2021), Vic Schmidt in the sci-fi series Orphan Black (2013–2014), and Mac Gargan in Spider-Man: Homecoming (2017). He is a two-time Canadian Screen Award and Screen Actors Guild Award nominee.

Early life 
Mando was born in Quebec City. He was raised by his father and is the second of three brothers. The family frequently travelled, living in more than 10 cities across four continents and in more than 35 homes, all before he was in his mid-20s. His native language is French, and he speaks English and Spanish fluently. He grew up wanting to be a writer or an athlete.

In his mid-20s he suffered a knee injury and consequently decided to change paths. He was enrolled in many fields, including international relations at the University of Montreal before discovering the performing arts at the Dome Theatre Program (Dawson College) in 2004. Despite no training he went on to play the male lead in all five productions of the program. He graduated in 2007. His Dome credits included Orlando in Shakespeare's As You Like It, Professor Katz in David Edgar's Pentecost, and Valentine Xavier in Tennessee Williams' Orpheus Descending. Steven W. Lecky, the chair of the program, called Mando "one of the finest talents to emerge from the program in the past 25 years."

Career 

After playing the leading character in two award-winning professional theatre productions in Montreal, Mando founded Red Barlo Productions. The company’s first film, Conditional Affection (which Mando starred in, directed and wrote) was released in 2010 and officially selected to Fantasia, Bare Bones, ACTRA Short Films, and the New Hope International Film Festivals.

Mando’s television debut simultaneously followed with a wide range of contrasting characters. His credits include guest appearances in the crime series The Bridge, the medical drama mini-series Bloodletting and Miraculous Cures, as an MS-13 gang member in The Border, and as a close friend of the character Kenzi (played by Ksenia Solo) in the sci-fi series Lost Girl.

Mando has had repeated collaborations with directors John Fawcett and Érik Canuel as well as producer David Barlow. He had a starring role in the 2010 feature film Territories. In 2011, he had a recurring role in Les Bleus de Ramville and a guest appearance on the series King. He is the voice and likeness of Vaas Montenegro, a major character of the 2012 video game Far Cry 3. He also starred in a webseries called The Far Cry Experience as Vaas, who captures and tortures Christopher Mintz-Plasse as himself. In the 2020s, Mando would reprise his role as Vaas for Far Cry VR: Dive Into Insanity and Far Cry 6.

In 2012, Mando was cast in the first season of the science fiction television series Orphan Black, which began airing in 2013. He played Vic, an abusive drug-dealer and was nominated for a Canadian Screen Award for his work on the series. He reprised his role of Vic in the second season in a recurring role. In 2014, Mando joined the cast of Better Call Saul, the Breaking Bad spin-off, portraying Nacho Varga, a career criminal.

In 2023, he was set to star in Apple's Sinking Spring, but he was let go due to a physical altercation with another cast member.

Filmography

Film

Television

Video games

Web

Accolades

References

External links 
 Michael Mando Official Site
 

Living people
Canadian male film actors
Canadian male television actors
Canadian male video game actors
Canadian male voice actors
21st-century Canadian male actors
Francophone Quebec people
Université de Montréal alumni
Male motion capture actors
1981 births